The Asellariales are an order of fungi classified under Kickxellomycotina.

Species include Asellaria dactylopus and Asellaria jatibonicua.

References

Zygomycota